The Outlet Collection Seattle, formerly SuperMall of the Great Northwest, is an outlet mall in Auburn, Washington, United States, that opened in August 1995.

History
The Outlet Collection Seattle opened on August 25, 1995, under the name "Supermall of the Great Northwest".

Its anchors then included Nordstrom Rack, Bed Bath and Beyond, Oshman's SuperSports USA (Later Sports Authority until 2016), Burlington Coat Factory, Saks Fifth Avenue (later Old Navy and Ulta Beauty), Marshalls (later Dave & Buster's) and Incredible Universe (later Sam's Club until 2018).

In its first year of business, the mall contained 175 stores and drew more than 14 million customers. By 1998, Saks Fifth Avenue and one fifth of the stores had closed.

New development has occurred in and around the mall since the mid-2000s, with the addition of several strip malls and restaurants. This development culminated in 2010, with the opening of a new Walmart Supercenter.

In May 2012, the outlet mall was renamed The Outlet Collection Seattle.

References

External links

Official web ste

Shopping malls in King County, Washington
Shopping malls established in 1995
Washington Prime Group
Buildings and structures in Auburn, Washington
Outlet malls in the United States
1995 establishments in Washington (state)